Bernd Juterzenka (born 5 February 1945) is a German boxer. He competed in the men's bantamweight event at the 1968 Summer Olympics.

References

1945 births
Living people
German male boxers
Olympic boxers of East Germany
Boxers at the 1968 Summer Olympics
Sportspeople from Neuruppin
Bantamweight boxers